The 1993 IPSC Handgun World Shoot X held in Bisley, England was the 10th IPSC Handgun World Shoot, and consisted of 5 days with 34 stages, teams from over 27 countries and much rain. The competition had been divided into the Open, Standard and Modified divisions. The Standard division was won by Ted Bonnet of United States, the Modified division by Robert Buntschu of Switzerland and the Open division by Matthew McLearn of United States. Born in Nova Scotia, Mclearn had moved to the U.S. five years prior the world championship to pursue gunsmithing training and advance in the competitive arena. Right before winning the World Shoot he also placed first in the U.S. IPSC Handgun Nationals.

Champions

Open
Individual

Teams

Modified
Individual

Standard
Individual

See also 
IPSC Rifle World Shoots
IPSC Shotgun World Shoot
IPSC Action Air World Shoot

References

Match Results - 1993 Handgun World Shoot, England - Diligentia: The Official Newsletter of IPSC Canada, February 1994, page 26
 Match Results - 1993 Handgun World Shoot X, Bisley - USPSA Frontsight 11-1997, page 31

1993
1993 in shooting sports
Shooting competitions in the United Kingdom
1993 in English sport
International sports competitions hosted by England